The CFM International RISE ("Revolutionary Innovation for Sustainable Engines") is an open rotor engine currently under development by CFM International, a 50–50 joint venture between American GE Aviation and French Safran Aircraft Engines. The engine is planned to support both hydrogen and sustainable aviation fuels, and it plans to achieve a 20% reduction in fuel burn and in carbon dioxide emissions compared to its predecessors.

Design and development

Background 
The 1973 oil crisis increased oil prices in the 1970s, which caused engine manufacturers to research new technologies to reduce fuel burn, including open rotor (also known as propfan) engines. However, none of those designs made into production aircraft, mostly due to decreasing oil prices and concerns over the high noise footprint of those engines.

Both Safran and GE Aviation had experimented with open rotor based engine designs in the years before the RISE project was announced. Safran had performed ground tests for an open rotor engine in 2019 as a part of the European Union's Clean Sky project, while GE had performed wind tunnel tests on a derivative of the GE36 engine at the start of the 2010s in collaboration with the Federal Aviation Administration.

Development 
CFM International announced the RISE program in June 2021 as an intended successor of the CFM LEAP 1 turbofan engine, with plans to enter service in the mid-2030s. At the 2022 Farnborough Airshow in July of that year, CFM International and Airbus announced plans to start flight tests for the RISE engine on an Airbus A380-based testbed in 2026.

See also

References

External links 
 CFM RISE

Propfan engines
General Electric aircraft engines
Snecma aircraft engines